Let Love Rule is the debut studio album of American rock musician Lenny Kravitz, released on September 6, 1989, by Virgin Records. Then-wife Lisa Bonet wrote the lyrics to "Fear" and co-wrote the lyrics on the song "Rosemary"; other than that the album is virtually a one-man Kravitz show, as he wrote and produced all the songs and played nearly all the instruments.

Let Love Rule reached number 61 on the Billboard 200, while it peaked at number 56 on the UK Albums Chart. The album is also featured in the book 1001 Albums You Must Hear Before You Die. The video for the lead single "Let Love Rule" was nominated for an MTV Video Music Award for Best New Artist.

Track listing
All tracks written by Lenny Kravitz, except "Fear" lyrics by Lisa Bonet, and "Rosemary" lyrics by Kravitz and Bonet.

"Sittin' on Top of the World" – 3:16
"Let Love Rule" – 5:42
"Freedom Train" – 2:50
"My Precious Love" – 5:15
"I Build This Garden for Us" – 6:16
"Fear" – 5:20
"Does Anybody Out There Even Care" – 3:42
"Mr. Cab Driver" – 3:49
"Rosemary" – 5:27
"Be" – 3:16

CD bonus tracks
 "Blues for Sister Someone" – 2:51
 "Empty Hands" – 4:42
 "Flower Child" – 2:56

American version
 "What The ... Are We Saying? – Live"
 "Stop Draggin' Around – Live"
 "Always on the Run – Live"
 "I'll Be Around – Live"

20th Anniversary Edition bonus tracks
All tracks written by Lenny Kravitz, except where noted.
 "Let Love Rule" (Basic Rough Mix)
 "Cold Turkey" (John Lennon)
 "Light Skin Girl from London"
 "Fear" (1987 demo)
 "Mr. Cab Driver" (home demo)
 "Let Love Rule" (home demo)

Track 16 first appeared on the single "Always on the Run", but was originally recorded on tour with "Let Love Rule".

Disc 2 (Let Love Rule Live)
"Flower Child"
"Blues for Sister Someone"
"Mr. Cab Driver"
"Freedom Train"
"Be"
"My Precious Love"
"Does Anybody Out There Even Care"
"Let Love Rule"
"Rosemary" (lyrics by Kravitz and Bonet)
"Fear" (lyrics by Bonet)
"My Flash on You" (Arthur Lee)
"If 6 Was 9" (Jimi Hendrix)

Tracks 1–10 recorded at The Paradise, Boston, Mass. – 3/28/90
Tracks 11–12 recorded at The Paradiso, Amsterdam – 12/20/89

Personnel
Credits adapted from the album's liner notes from the 20th Anniversary Deluxe Edition.

Musicians
 Lenny Kravitz – lead and backing vocals, all other instruments
 Alfred Brown – viola 
 Tisha Campbell – additional background vocals 
 Eric Delente – violin 
 Karl Denson – saxophone 
 Lou Elex – violin 
 Henry Hirsch – bass , Fender Rhodes , harmonium , organ , piano 
 Nancy Ives – cello 
 Lee Jaffe – harmonica 
 Jean McClain – additional background vocals 
 Kermit Moore – cello 
 Gene Orloff – violin 
 Yolanda Pittman – additional background vocals 
 Matthew Raimondi – violin 
 Maxine Roach – viola 
 Mark Shuman – cello 
 John Tintaualle – violin 
 Adam Widoff – 2nd guitar 
 Winterton Yarvey – violin 

Production
 Lenny Kravitz – producer, mixing 
 Henry Hirsch – recording engineer , mixing 
 David Domanich – recording engineer 
 Jeff Goodman – recording engineer , mixing 
 Greg Calbi – mastering
 Mathieu Bitton – producer 
 Gavin Lurssen – remastering 
 Ruben Cohen – remastering assistant 

Let Love Rule Live
 Lenny Kravitz – vocals, guitar
 Kenneth Crouch – keyboards
 Zoro – drums
 Adam Widoff – guitar
 Lebron Scott – bass
 Karl Denson – saxophone
 Steven Remote – recording engineer and mixing engineer 
 Tom "Bone" Edmonds – recording engineer and mixing engineer , original mixing 
 Mathieu Bitton – editing
 Gabriel Wallach – editing

Charts

Weekly charts

Year-end charts

Certifications and sales

References

External links
Lenny Kravitz interview by Pete Lewis, 'Blues & Soul' July 2009
Let Love Rule on cduniverse.com

1989 debut albums
Lenny Kravitz albums
Virgin Records albums
Albums produced by Lenny Kravitz